Harrington Clare Lees (17 March 187010 January 1929) was the Anglican Archbishop of Melbourne from 1921 until his death.

Family
Lees was born in Ashton-under-Lyne, Lancashire, United Kingdom, the eldest son of William Lees, a cotton farmer and Justice of the Peace, and his wife, Emma (daughter of William Clare). Lees married twice, firstly to Winifred May, daughter of the Revd J. M. Cranswick, and secondly to Joanna Mary, daughter of Herbert Linnell. He had no children.

Education

Lees was educated at The Leys School (a Methodist school) and St John's College, Cambridge, where he graduated BA with a second class in the theological tripos in 1892, and MA in 1896.

Career
Lees was made deacon on Trinity Sunday (28 May) 1893 and ordained priest the following Trinity Sunday (20 May 1894) — both times by William Stubbs, Bishop of Oxford, at St Mary Magdalen's Church, Oxford. He was a curate at Reading, Berkshire, chaplain at Turin and curate at Childwall, until in 1900 he became vicar of St John's Kenilworth.
In 1907 Lees became vicar of Christ Church, Beckenham, and in 1919 vicar of Swansea. In this year he was offered the bishopric of Bendigo, Victoria, Australia, but refused it. In August 1921 he was appointed Archbishop of Melbourne; was consecrated a bishop on All Saints' Day (1 November) by Randall Davidson, Archbishop of Canterbury, at St Paul's Cathedral, London; and enthroned at St Paul's Cathedral, Melbourne, on 15 February 1922.

Lees soon showed himself to be a vigorous worker and a good preacher. He was at Melbourne for less than seven years before he died, but his episcopate was marked by the undertaking of the completion of St Paul's Cathedral and by a great increase in the social work of the church; more especially in connexion with the various homes conducted by the mission of St James and St John and the Church of England free kindergartens. He visited England in 1928 and died suddenly at Bishopscourt, East Melbourne, on 10 January 1929.

Lees' portrait by John Longstaff is in the chapter house at Melbourne.

Lees never spared himself and overwork was a contributing cause of his comparatively early death from coronary vascular disease. He had bright personality and was much like by everyone, whether in an industrial parish like Swansea or as archbishop of Melbourne. At synod he was an excellent chairman, speaking little himself, but giving his rulings with decision. In the evangelistic tradition of the diocese, he belonged to no party and his ability, humanity and broad outlook, made him an excellent leader of his church.

Publications

Lees' published works include: 

St Paul's Epistles to Thessalonica (1905)
The Work of Witness and the Promise of Power (1908)
The Joy of Bible Study (1909)
The King's Highway (1910)
St Paul and his Converts (1910), third impression (1916)
Christ and his Slaves (1911)
The Sunshine of the Good News (1912)
The Divine Master in Home Life (1915)
The Practice of the Love of Christ (1915)
The Eyes of his Glory (1916)
St Paul's Friends (1917)
The Love that Ceases to Calculate (1918)
God's Garden and Ours (1918)
Failure and Recovery (1919)
The Starting Place of Victory (1919)
The Promise of Life The Life that is in Christ Jesus (1919)
 The Divine Master in Home Life

Lees was also a contributor to Hastings' A Dictionary of Christ and the Gospels.

References

External links
 

1870 births
1929 deaths
Alumni of St John's College, Cambridge
Anglican archbishops of Melbourne
People from Ashton-under-Lyne